Brusnengo is a comune (municipality) in the Province of Biella in the Italian region Piedmont, located about  northeast of Turin and about  northeast of Biella.

Brusnengo borders the following municipalities: Curino, Masserano, Roasio, Rovasenda.

References

Cities and towns in Piedmont